The 2016 Malaysia Super League was the 13th season of the Malaysia Super League, the top-tier professional football league in Malaysia.

The season began on 13 February and concluded on 22 October 2016.

Johor Darul Ta'zim were the defending champions and retained the title from the previous season. They became the first club in the Malaysian football history to win the Liga Super title for three consecutive years.

Johor Darul Ta'zim also set a new record after went through the season without a single defeat – the first team ever to do so in a 22-fixtures league season. Johor Darul Ta'zim finished its "Invincibles" season with 18 wins, 4 draws, 0 defeats and 58 points in total.

Teams
Sime Darby were relegated after finishing bottom in the 2015 season. ATM were also relegated after losing the play-off to T-Team, which replaced LionsXII in the league.

Stadiums and locations

 Primary venues used in the Liga Super:

  1 Correct as of end of 2015 Liga Super season

Personnel and sponsoring

Note: Flags indicate national team as has been defined under FIFA eligibility rules. Players may hold more than one non-FIFA nationality.

Coaching changes

Foreign players
Players name in bold indicates the player is registered during the mid-season transfer window.

Results

League table

Result table

Positions by round
The table lists the positions of teams after each week of matches. In order to preserve chronological evolvements, any postponed matches are not included in the round at which they were originally scheduled, but added to the full round they were played immediately afterwards. For example, if a match is scheduled for matchday 13, but then postponed and played between days 16 and 17, it will be added to the standings for day 16.

Relegation play-off

T-Team have qualified for the 2016 Malaysia Super League season.

Statistics

Scoring

Top scorers

Own goals

Hat-tricks

Note
4 Player scored 4 goals

Clean sheets

Discipline

Players

Club

Awards

Monthly awards

Attendance

Crowd Attendance For All Venues

By Week

source:Sistem Pengurusan Maklumat Bolasepak

Number of teams by states and federal territories

See also
 2016 Liga Premier
 2016 Liga FAM
 2016 Piala FA
 2016 Piala Malaysia
 2016 Piala Presiden
 2016 Piala Belia
 List of Malaysian football transfers 2016
 List of Malaysian football transfers summer 2016

References

External links
 Football Association of Malaysia

Malaysia Super League seasons
1
Liga Super